Millfield is a co-educational independent boarding school in Somerset, England.

Millfield or Milfield may also refer to:

Places

In Australia
Millfield, New South Wales, a suburb of Cessnock

In the United Kingdom
 Millfield, Aberdeenshire, a location
 Millfield, Peterborough, Cambridgeshire
 Milfield, Northumberland
 Millfield, Tyne and Wear, a suburb of Sunderland
 Millfield Metro station, Tyne and Wear

In the United States
 Millfield, Ohio

Schools 
Millfield Science & Performing Arts College, a secondary school in Lancashire, England

See also
 Millfield Mine disaster, Ohio, USA
 Millfields, Lea Bridge, London Borough of Hackney